The 1975 UAAP men's basketball tournament was the 38th year of the men's tournament of the University Athletic Association of the Philippines (UAAP)'s basketball championship. Hosted by University of the East, the UE Warriors defeated the FEU Tamaraws in the finals taking their fourteenth overall and back-to-back UAAP men's basketball championship.

Finals

University of the East, with Tito Varela providing the hustle and power and Emer Legaspi humbling the number of guards thrown to him, beat Far Eastern University, 85-80, to retain the title it won from the same team the prior year.

Emer Legaspi, the same Warrior the Tamaraws limited to 11 in their clash a week before the championship fight, finished with 31. FEU's Anastacio Deles and Pablo Javier, failed miserably in containing the UE hotshot who got all the screens he needed from Varela and Benjie Chua. Varela showed his national teammate Nicanor Bulaong what power in basketball could be. FEU's duo of Bulaong and Anthony Dasalla proved no match to UE's head-shaven hero.

References 
http://www.gameface.ph/showthread.php?30055-Retro-1970s-basketball-articles
http://rpbasketballphotos.blogspot.com/2013/09/1975-1976-uaap-senior-basketball-title.html
https://www.ue.edu.ph/news/?p=2980

38
1975 in Philippine basketball